The European Agency for Reconstruction used to manage EU's main assistance programmes in Serbia, Kosovo (under UNSCR 1244/99), Montenegro and North Macedonia. The Agency was headquartered in Thessaloniki, Greece, with operational centres in Pristina (Kosovo), Belgrade (Serbia), Podgorica (Montenegro) and Skopje (Republic of Macedonia).

In December 2008, the EAR officially closed its doors as its mandate came to an end. Since its creation in the aftermath of the Kosovo War, the agency handled a portfolio of almost three billion euros.

References

External links
European Agency for Reconstruction
Easy Reading Corner - Booklets - How the European Union works

Agencies of the European Union
Investment promotion agencies